Donald West VanArtsdalen (sometimes listed as Van Artsdalen; October 21, 1919 – May 21, 2019) was a senior United States district judge of the United States District Court for the Eastern District of Pennsylvania.

Education and career
Born in Doylestown, Pennsylvania, VanArtsdalen served in the Canadian Army from 1940 to 1942, and as a United States Army sergeant from 1942 to 1945. 

He then received a Bachelor of Laws degree from the University of Pennsylvania Law School in 1948, and entered into private practice in Doylestown in 1948, working as a lawyer until 1970. His legal tenure also included a period in which he served as a district attorney for Bucks County, Pennsylvania from 1954 to 1958.

Federal judicial service

On September 10, 1970, President Richard Nixon nominated VanArtsdalen to a new seat on the United States District Court for the Eastern District of Pennsylvania created by 84 Stat. 294. VanArtsdalen was confirmed by the United States Senate on October 8, 1970, and received his commission on October 15, 1970. He assumed senior status on October 21, 1985. He died on May 21, 2019, aged 99, after battling leukemia.

See also
 List of United States federal judges by longevity of service

References

External links
 

1919 births
2019 deaths
Canadian Army personnel
United States Army non-commissioned officers
People from Doylestown, Pennsylvania
Military personnel from Pennsylvania
Deaths from cancer in Pennsylvania
Deaths from leukemia
County district attorneys in Pennsylvania
Judges of the United States District Court for the Eastern District of Pennsylvania
United States district court judges appointed by Richard Nixon
University of Pennsylvania Law School alumni
20th-century American judges
American people of Dutch descent
United States Army personnel of World War II
Canadian Army personnel of World War II